Anthene uzungwae is a butterfly in the family Lycaenidae. It is found from south-central Tanzania to the Udzungwa Mountains.

The length of the forewings is 14–16 mm. The upperside of the wings is shiny deep violet blue with a narrow black marginal line. The underside ground colour is dark grey.

References

Butterflies described in 1990
Anthene
Endemic fauna of Tanzania
Butterflies of Africa